Sully Creek is a stream in the U.S. state of South Dakota.

Sully Creek took its name from nearby Fort Sully.

See also
List of rivers of South Dakota

References

Rivers of Sully County, South Dakota
Rivers of South Dakota